Susan Ann Jebb  is Chair of the United Kingdom's Food Standards Agency and Professor of Diet and Population Health at the Nuffield Department of Primary Care Health Sciences, University of Oxford.

Career
In 2008, Jebb was awarded an OBE for services to public health. In 2015, she was criticised in an investigation by the British Medical Journal for her closeness to the sugar industry. In 2018, she was appointed Fellow of the Medical Academy of Sciences.

Jebb's research has suggested that a referral to commercial weight management weight loss programmes delivered in the community may be a cost-effective way to treat obesity in primary care. Her more recent work has studied how our perception of portion size as normal or smaller than normal can affect the amount of food we eat, and how shoppers can be influenced to choose decreased salt alternatives at the grocery store.

Jebb is a member of The Times Health Commission. In January 2023, her comments were the subject of some media attention after she appeared to compare bringing cake into the workplace to passive smoking.

Personal life
When at Cambridge, she lived in Steeple Morden, near Royston, Hertfordshire; she now lives in Shropshire.

References

External links 
 

Living people
1964 births
Academics of the University of Oxford
British nutritionists
Food policy in the United Kingdom
Obesity in the United Kingdom
Officers of the Order of the British Empire
People from Ellesmere, Shropshire
People from South Cambridgeshire District